Rosalba arawakiana is a species of beetle in the family Cerambycidae. It was described by Villiers in 1980. It is known from Guadeloupe.

References

Rosalba (beetle)
Beetles described in 1980